Gordon Primary School may refer to:

Gordon Primary School in Gordon, Australian Capital Territory
Gordon Primary School in Huntly, Aberdeenshire, Scotland